In Buddhism, a śikṣamāṇā (Sanskrit; Pali: sikkhamānā; ;) is a female novice trainee. This training period is to be two years long, supervised by both a monk and a nun. After this period, the trainee may attempt full ordination as a bhikṣuṇī.

Overview
According to Buddhist tradition, a young woman should be ordained, by both a monk and a nun, first as a śrāmaṇerī. Then, after a year, or at the age of 20, she may be ordained as a full bhikṣuṇī.

The Theravada vinaya has 311 rules of discipline for bhikkhunis. Within Chinese society, as an example, members of the Sangha are expected to renounce family connections and accept the Sangha as their family.

Thus, according to Vinaya Pitaka, the ordination order for women is:

 Śrāmaṇerī
 Śikṣamāṇā
 Bhikṣuṇī

See also
Anagarika (pre-ordaination)
Ordination process

External links
"In depth comparative study of the Sikkhamānā training from all Vinayas"
Monastic Resources - Training
"Female Monks In Buddhism", by Dhammacaro (07/23/2005).
"Vinaya Pitaka", brief description includes "Order of ordination for men and women...."

Buddhist nuns
Buddhist monasticism
Sanskrit words and phrases
Buddhist titles
Ordination of women in Buddhism